Yves Netzhammer (born 1970) is a Swiss artist who lives and works in Zurich. Born in Schaffhausen, he studied architecture there and later obtained a diploma at the Hochschule für Gestaltung und Kunst Zürich, department of visual design. He has been working with video installations, slide projections, drawings and objects since 1997. Since 2006 Netzhammer publishes online in the blog Journal for Art, Sex and Mathematics. In 2007 he represented Switzerland at the 52nd Venice Biennale together with Ugo Rondinone, Urs Fischer and Christine Streuli.

External links
Source
Yves Netzhammer's homepage
Anita Beckers' Gallery
Frequent contributions by Netzhammer to the Journal for Art, Sex and Mathematics
Bio, Sites, Exhibitions
Exhibitions, Group shows

Swiss artists
1970 births
Living people
Zurich University of the Arts alumni
People from Schaffhausen
Swiss contemporary artists